Don Luis Ruspoli dei Principi Ruspoli y Morenés (November 28, 1933 – May 25, 2011) was a Spanish aristocrat, second son of Carlos Ruspoli, 4th Duke of Alcudia and Sueca, and wife, María de Belén Morenés y Arteaga, 18th Countess of Bañares.

He was 7th Marquis of Boadilla del Monte, 2nd Baron of Mascalbó.

Marriages and children 
He married in Madrid December 2, 1960, and divorced in 1983, Doña María del Carmen Sanchíz y Núñez-Robres (born 1942), 13th Marquise of La Casta, daughter of Hipólito Sánchiz y Quesada, 4th Count of Valdemar, of the Marquises of Vasto, and his wife, Doña María del Pilar Núñez-Robres y Rodríguez de Valcárcel of the Marquises of Montortal and Montenuevo, Counts of Pestagua, and had four children:

 Donna Mónica Ruspoli dei Principi Ruspoli y Sanchíz, (born 1961), married in 1988 with Don Alonso Dezcallar y Mazarredo, Spanish ambassador, and had issue:
Doña Mónica Dezcallar y Ruspoli, Mazarredo y Sanchíz (August 9, 1990 –)
Doña Belén Dezcallar y Ruspoli, Mazarredo y Sanchíz (September 29, 1994 –)
 Luis Carlos Ruspoli, 6th Duke of Alcudia and Sueca
 Donna María de Belén Ruspoli dei Principi Ruspoli y Sanchíz, (born 1964), married in 1996 with Cesare Passi y Ferrero di Cambiano, Count Passi di Preposulo (born 1950) and had issue:
Don Alejandro Passi y Ruspoli, Ferrero di Cambiano y Sanchíz, dei Conti Passi di Preposulo (Madrid, January 6, 1998 –)
Donna María del Carmen Passi y Ruspoli, Ferrero di Cambiano y Sanchíz, dei Conti Passi di Preposulo (Madrid, November 17, 2003 –)
Don Luca Passi y Ruspoli, Ferrero di Cambiano y Sanchíz, dei Conti Passi di Preposulo (Madrid, November 20, 2006 –)
 Don Santiago Ruspoli dei Principi Ruspoli y Sanchíz (1971 – 1996), unmarried and without issue.

Ancestry

Additional information

See also 
 Ruspoli

Sources 

 
 
 
 

1933 births
2011 deaths
Counts of Spain
Dukes of Spain
Grandees of Spain
Luis
Knights of Malta
Luis 07